Ostrów  is a village in the administrative district of Gmina Aleksandrów, within Piotrków County, Łódź Voivodeship, in central Poland. It is also the smallest village of Gmina Aleksandrów. 

The village has a population of 20.

References

Villages in Piotrków County